IAC Inc. is an American holding company that owns brands across 100 countries, mostly in media and Internet. The company is incorporated under Delaware General Corporation Law and headquartered in New York City. Joey Levin, who previously led the company's search & applications segment, has served as chief executive officer since June 2015.

History

1980s and 1990s
IAC was established in 1986 as Silver King Broadcasting Company, as part of a plan to increase viewership of the Home Shopping Network (HSN) by purchasing local television stations. By 1988, Silver King had bought 11 stations for about $220 million. The company was later renamed as HSN Communications, Inc., and then Silver King Communications, Inc. In 1992, Silver King was spun off to HSN shareholders as a separately traded public company. In August 1995, Barry Diller acquired control of Silver King, in a deal backed by the company's largest shareholder, Liberty Media.  Diller, who had led the creation of the Fox network, reportedly hoped to use Silver King's stations as the foundation for a new broadcast network.

The company acquired several assets in the late 1990s. In December 1996, Silver King acquired an 80% stake in HSN for $1.3 billion in stock, and changed its own name to HSN, Inc. At the same time, the company acquired Savoy Pictures, a failed film studio that owned four Fox affiliate stations through SF Broadcasting, for $210 million in stock.

HSN purchased a controlling stake in Ticketmaster Group in July 1997, and then acquired the rest of the company in June 1998. In February 1998, it acquired the television assets of Universal Studios (including USA Network, Sci-Fi Channel, and Universal Television's domestic production and distribution arms) for $4.1 billion. The company's name was changed to USA Networks, Inc. at this point. Continuing its acquisition strategy, the company acquired the Hotel Reservations Network in May 1999 for $149 million.

USA Networks merged the online division of Ticketmaster with city guide website Citysearch in September 1998, establishing a new company that went public as Ticketmaster Online–CitySearch (TMCS). USA then sold Ticketmaster proper to TMCS in 2001, retaining a 61 percent share in the combined company, which became known as simply Ticketmaster. USA brought Ticketmaster back under full ownership in 2003, purchasing all outstanding shares.

2000s
In the early 2000s, USA Networks began divesting itself of its traditional television broadcasting and production units. In May 2001, Univision Communications acquired USA Broadcasting (a division of USA Networks including 13 local stations). The next year, Vivendi bought the rest of USA's broadcast entertainment businesses, including the USA Network and Sci-Fi Channel. This led to the creation of a new company named Vivendi Universal Entertainment, led by Diller. Throughout this transition, USA Networks continued to build up its online portfolio. In July 2001, the company entered the online travel business with its acquisition of Expedia, followed the next year by an acquisition of Interval International.

Following the shift in focus to online assets, the company changed its name to USA Interactive (USAI) in May 2002; InterActiveCorp in June 2003; and finally to IAC/InterActiveCorp in July 2004.

In August 2003, IAC acquired the online mortgage comparison site LendingTree, and in September, the company added discount travel website Hotwire.com to its growing list of acquisitions. In October, IAC agreed to buy French travel site Anyway.com from Transat A.T. for $62.7 million.

In 2004 and 2005, IAC continued its growth through acquisition, adding assets including Tripadvisor, ServiceMagic, and Ask Jeeves. It also launched Gifts.com during this period. In August 2005, the company bundled together its travel-related sites and spun them off as a new public company, Expedia, Inc. Additional acquisitions in 2006 included ShoeBuy.com, which the company later sold to Jet, and Connected Ventures including CollegeHumor and Vimeo.

In May 2008, IAC and Ask.com acquired Lexico, the owner of Dictionary.com, Thesaurus.com, and Reference.com. In August 2008, IAC spun off several of its businesses, including: Tree.com (formerly LendingTree), the Home Shopping Network, Ticketmaster, and Interval International.

In 2009, IAC acquired Urbanspoon and People Media, and launched the production company Notional. IAC would later sell Urbanspoon to Zomato in 2015.

2010s
IAC's largest shareholder, Liberty Media, exited the company in 2010, following a protracted dispute over the 2008 spinoffs. Liberty traded its IAC stock for $220 million in cash, plus ownership of Evite and Gifts.com. On the same day, Diller stepped down as CEO, though he remained as chairman and Match.com CEO Greg Blatt was appointed to succeed him. That same year, IAC acquired dating site Singlesnet and fitness site DailyBurn.

In January 2013, IAC acquired online tutoring firm Tutor.com. On August 3, 2013, IAC sold Newsweek to the International Business Times on undisclosed terms. On December 22, 2013, IAC fired their director of corporate communications after an AIDS joke she posted to Twitter went viral, being re-tweeted and scorned around the world. The incident became a byword for the need for people to be cautious about what they post on social media.

In 2014, IAC acquired ASKfm for an undisclosed sum.

In November 2015, IAC and Match Group announced the closing of Match Group's previously announced initial public offering.

In May 2017, HomeAdvisor combined with Angie's List, forming the new publicly traded company ANGI Homeservices Inc. The company made its stock market debut in October 2017. In October 2018, ANGI made its first acquisition of on-demand platform Handy.

In January 2019, IAC sold Citysearch parent CityGrid to eLocal. In July 2019, IAC made its largest investment ever in the world's largest peer-to-peer car sharing marketplace, Turo. Later that year, IAC acquired Care.com. In December 2019, IAC and Match Group entered into an agreement providing for the full separation of Match Group from the remaining businesses of IAC.

2020s

In January 2020, IAC withdrew its financial backing for CollegeHumor and its sister websites and sold the websites to Chief Creative Officer Sam Reich. As a result of the restructuring, more than 100 employees of CollegeHumor were laid off. In February, IAC completed its $500 million acquisition of Care.com.

In July 2020, IAC and Match Group announced the successful completion of the separation of Match Group from the remaining businesses of IAC. As a result of the separation, Match Group's dual class voting structure was eliminated and the interest in Match Group formerly held by IAC is now held directly by IAC's shareholders. As of the separation, "new" IAC trades under the symbol "IAC" and "new" Match Group under the symbol "MTCH."

In August 2020, IAC announced it had invested a 12% stake in MGM Resorts International.

In May 2021, IAC completed the spin-off of Vimeo, the 11th company to be spun-off from IAC. Vimeo trades on Nasdaq under the symbol "VMEO".

In October 2021, IAC announced the acquisition of Meredith Corporation's National Media Group for $2.7 billion. The deal closed December 1, 2021, and the acquired Meredith (and the former Time Inc.) assets merged with IAC subsidiary Dotdash, forming a new entity called Dotdash Meredith.

In August 2022, IAC officially changed its legal entity (IAC/InterActiveCorp) to reflect what it's actually called: IAC Inc. In October, IAC agreed to sell its workforce-as-a-service platform Bluecrew to EmployBridge with IAC remaining a minority shareholder in Bluecrew's business.

Businesses 
IAC's businesses are categorized into distinct segments for the purposes of financial reporting. Those segments are labelled by the company as Angi Inc., Dotdash Meredith, Search, and Emerging and Other. Each business listed may have multiple brands connected to it.

Angi Inc. 
On May 1, 2017, IAC announced it had entered into a definitive agreement with Angie's List to combine HomeAdvisor, a digital marketplace for maintenance and repair services, and Angie's List into a new publicly traded company named ANGI Homeservices Inc. In March 2021, the company changed its name to Angi.

 Angi
 CraftJack
 Fixd Repair
 Handy
 HomeAdvisor
 HomeStars (Canada)
 ImproveNet
 Instapro (Italy)
 mHelpDesk
 MyBuilder (United Kingdom)
 MyHammer (Germany, Austria)
 Travaux.com (France)
 Werkspot (Netherlands)

Dotdash Meredith 

 Allrecipes
 Better Homes & Gardens
 The Balance
 Brides
 Byrdie
 Entertainment Weekly
 Food + Wine
 Health
 InStyle
 Investopedia 
 Lifewire
 Liquor.com 
 Martha Stewart Living
 MNI Targeted Media
 MyDomaine
 People
 People en Español
 Real Simple
 Serious Eats
 Shape
 Simply Recipes
 Southern Living
 The Spruce
 ThoughtCo
 Travel + Leisure
 TreeHugger
 TripSavvy 
 Verywell

Search 

 Ask Media Group
 Ask Applications
 Excite.com

Other 

 Bluecrew
 Care.com
 The Daily Beast
 IAC Films
 Mosaic Group
 Newco
 Vivian Health

See also

References

External links

 
 

 
American companies established in 1995
Companies listed on the Nasdaq
Conglomerate companies established in 1995
Conglomerate companies of the United States
Film production companies of the United States
Holding companies based in New York City
Holding companies established in 1995
Online mass media companies of the United States
Publicly traded companies based in New York City